Luca Ansoldi (born January 5, 1982 in Merano, Italy) is an Italian professional ice hockey player currently playing for HC Merano of the Italian Hockey League. He has previously played in Serie A for Ritten Sport, SG Cortina, HC Bolzano and Hockey Milano Rossoblu.

Ansoldi participated at the 2006, 2007, 2008, 2010 and 2012 IIHF World Championship as a member of the Italian national team. He also played in the 2006 Winter Olympics.

References

External links
 

1982 births
Bolzano HC players
SG Cortina players
Ice hockey players at the 2006 Winter Olympics
Italian ice hockey right wingers
Living people
HC Merano players
Olympic ice hockey players of Italy
Ritten Sport players
Sportspeople from Merano